Ab Band (also Romanized as Āb Band) is a village in Ij Rural District, in the Central District of Estahban County, Fars Province, Iran. At the 2006 census, its population was 217, in 52 families.

References 

Populated places in Estahban County